Theresa Brick (born ) is a Canadian weightlifter, competing in the 75 kg category and representing Canada at international competitions. She competed at world championships, most recently at the 1999 World Weightlifting Championships. She also represented Canada as a discus thrower.

Brick was inducted in the Manitoba Sports Hall of Fame in 2005 for weightlifting and athletics.

Major results

References

1965 births
Living people
Canadian female weightlifters
Place of birth missing (living people)
Canadian female discus throwers
Pan American Games track and field athletes for Canada
Athletes (track and field) at the 1991 Pan American Games
Athletes (track and field) at the 1995 Pan American Games
Commonwealth Games competitors for Canada
Athletes (track and field) at the 1994 Commonwealth Games
World Weightlifting Championships medalists
20th-century Canadian women
21st-century Canadian women